Martha Cope is a British actress, known for her various roles in the BBC soap opera Doctors. She has appeared in many British programmes including Holby City, Men Behaving Badly, Peak Practice and Family Affairs between 2002 and 2003 when she played the role of Anna Gregory. In 2021, she joined the BBC soap opera EastEnders as Sandy Gibson.

Life and career
Cope was born to parents Renny Lister and Kenneth Cope, both of whom were actors. Throughout her career, she has made appearances in television series including Doctors, Men Behaving Badly, Peak Practice, Holby City and Family Affairs. Then in 2021, she was cast in the role of Sandy Gibson in the BBC soap opera EastEnders.

Filmography

References

External links
 

British television actresses
Living people
Year of birth missing (living people)